Mirra Alfassa (21 February 1878 – 17 November 1973), known to her followers as The Mother or La Mère, was a spiritual guru, occultist and yoga teacher, and a collaborator of Sri Aurobindo, who considered her to be of equal yogic stature to him and called her by the name "The Mother". She founded the Sri Aurobindo Ashram and established the town of Auroville; she was influential on the subject of Integral Yoga.

Mirra Alfassa (Mother) was born in Paris in 1878 to a Sephardi Jewish bourgeois family. In her youth, she traveled to Algeria to practice occultism along with Max Théon. After returning, while living in Paris, she guided a group of spiritual seekers. In 1914, she traveled to Pondicherry, India and met Sri Aurobindo and found in him "the dark Asiatic figure" of whom she had had visions and called him Krishna. During this first visit, she helped publish a French version of the periodical Arya, which serialized most of Sri Aurobindo's post-political prose writings. During the First World war she was obliged to leave Pondicherry. After a 4-year stay in Japan, in 1920 she returned to Pondicherry for good. Gradually, as more and more people joined her and Sri Aurobindo, she organised and developed Sri Aurobindo Ashram. In 1943, she started a school in the ashram and in 1968 established Auroville, an experimental township dedicated to human unity and evolution. She died on 17 November 1973 in Pondicherry.

Satprem, who was one of her followers, captured the last thirty years of Alfassa's life in the 13-volume work, Mother's Agenda.

Early life

Childhood 

Mirra Alfassa was born in 1878 in Paris to Moïse Maurice Alfassa, a Turkish Jewish father who migrated from Edirne via Egypt, and Mathilde Ismalun, an Egyptian Jewish mother. They were a bourgeois family, and Mirra's full name at birth was Blanche Rachel Mirra Alfassa. She had an elder brother, Mattéo Mathieu Maurice Alfassa, who later held numerous French governmental posts in Africa. The family had just migrated to France a year before Mirra was born. Mirra was close to her grandmother Mira Ismalum (née Pinto), who was a neighbour and who was one of the first women to travel alone outside Egypt.

Mirra learnt to read at the age of seven and joined school very late at the age of nine. She was interested in various fields of art, tennis, music and singing, but was a concern to her mother owing to an apparent lack of permanent interest in any particular field. By the age of 14 she had read most of the books in her father's collection, which is believed to have helped her achieve mastery of French. Her biographer Vrekhem notes that Mirra had various occult experiences in her childhood but knew nothing of their significance or relevance. She kept these experiences to herself, as her mother would have regarded occult experiences as a mental problem to be treated. Mirra especially recalls at the age of thirteen or fourteen having a dream or a vision of a luminous figure whom she used to call Krishna but had never seen before in real life.

As an artist and traveller

In Paris 
In 1893 after graduating from school, Mirra joined Académie Julian to study art. Her grandmother Mira introduced her to :fr:Henri Morisset, an ex-student of the Académie; they were married on 13 October 1897. Both were well off and worked as artists for the next ten years, during an era known for having many impressionist artists. Her son André was born on 23 August 1898. Some of Alfassa's paintings were accepted by the jury of Salon d'Automne and were exhibited in 1903, 1904 and 1905. She recalls herself being a complete atheist at this time, yet was experiencing various memories which she found were not mental formations but spontaneous experiences. She kept those experiences to herself and developed an urge to understand their significance. She came across the book Raja yoga by Swami Vivekananda, which provided some of the explanations she was looking for. Mirra also received a copy of the Bhagavad Gita in French, which helped her considerably in learning more about these experiences.

Max Théon and Mrs. Théon (Mary Ware) 

During this time Mirra made the acquaintance of Louis Thémanlys who was the head of the Cosmic Movement, a group started by Max Théon. Through reading a copy of Cosmic Review, she attended Thémanlys's speeches and became active in the group. For the first time, on 14 July 1906, she journeyed alone to the Algerian city of Tlemcen to meet with Max Théon and his wife Mary Ware. She consequently travelled twice more, in 1906 and 1907, to their estate at Tlemcen and there practised and experimented with the teachings of Max Théon & Mary Ware.

In 1908, Mirra moved to 49 rue de Lévis, Paris, living alone in a small apartment and involving herself in discussions with Buddhists and Cosmic movement circles. During this time she also made the acquaintance of Madame David Néel. Mirra married Paul Richard in 1911 who after serving four years in the army had involved himself in philosophy & theology. He had come to know Mirra when he was in discussions with Max Théon. Vrekhem, a biographer of Mirra, mentions that Richard was undergoing a legal problem in inheriting children from his first marriage to a Dutch woman, and had asked Mirra for help which she had accepted by marrying him.

First meetings with Sri Aurobindo and Japan 

Richard was also an aspiring politician and had attempted to win election to the French senate from Pondicherry, which was then under French control. Despite his initial failure he wanted to make a second attempt, and on 7 March 1914 Mirra along with Richard set sail to India and reached Pondicherry by 29 March. It was in 1914 that Mirra Alfassa who later came to be known as The Mother, first set foot in Puducherry stayed in Grand Hotel D'Europe and met Sri Aurobindo. After reaching Pondicherry, they fixed an appointment with Sri Aurobindo who was then settled in Pondicherry and had suspended all his activity for Indian independence from British rule. When she first met Sri Aurobindo, Mirra recognized in him the person whom she used to see in her dreams. During a later meeting, she experienced a complete silence of the mind, free from any thought.

Richard lost the elections to Paul Bluysen whom he had supported in previous elections. Richard decided to publish a review of the yoga of Sri Aurobindo, and to be called Arya and be bilingual in both English and French. The Journal was first published on 15 August 1914 and ran for the next six and half years. Consequent journals published were later made into complete books. By this time World War I had erupted, and Indian revolutionaries were being prosecuted by the British for being spies of the German army. Although Sri Aurobindo had totally dispensed his activities against British rule, he was considered unsafe and all the revolutionaries were asked to move to Algeria. Sri Aurobindo had refused this offer, so the British had written to the French government in Paris asking to hand over revolutionaries staying at French Pondicherry. This request came to Mirra's brother, Mattéo Alfassa, who by then was foreign minister and who filed the request under other working files never to be looked upon again.

On the insistence of the British in 1915, Richard was ordered to move out of Pondicherry. After an unsuccessful attempt to stay, both Mirra and Richard left for Paris on 22 February 1915. After a few years, Richard was ordered to promote French trade in Japan (which was then an ally of France and Britain) and China. Mirra left for Japan along with Richard, never to return to Paris again.

Mirra and Richard stayed in Japan and made acquaintances among the Indian community. Their time in Japan was relatively peaceful, and they spent the following four years there. On 24 April 1920 Mirra returned with Richard to Pondicherry accompanied by Dorothy Hodgson. Mirra moved to live near Sri Aurobindo in the guest house at Rue François Martin. Richard did not stay long in India; he spent a year travelling around North India returning to France and remarried in England after officially divorcing Mirra. After working a few years as a professor in the United States he died in 1968. On 24 November 1920 due to a storm and heavy rain, Sri Aurobindo asked Mirra and Dorothy Hodgson (later known as Dutta) to move into Sri Aurobindo's house, and she started living in the house along with other residents.

Foundation of the ashram 

With time many influenced by Arya Magazine and others who had heard about Sri Aurobindo started to come to his residence either permanently to reside or to practise Sri Aurobindo's yoga. Mirra was initially not totally accepted by the other household members and was considered an outsider. Sri Aurobindo considered her to be of equal yogic stature and started calling her "The Mother", and she was known to the whole community as such from then on. Around 1924 onwards Mother was starting to organise the day-to-day functioning of the household and slowly the house was turning into an ashram with many followers flowing in every day. After 1926 Sri Aurobindo started to retire from regular activities and put his complete focus towards yogic practises. The community had grown to 85 members by then and the group had slowly turned into a spiritual ashram.

Integral yoga and the Siddhi Day 
The Mother was a revered yoga teacher in a modern context. On 24 November 1926, later declared as Siddhi Day (Victory Day) and still celebrated by Sri Aurobindo Ashram, Mother and Sri Aurobindo declared that overmind consciousness had manifested directly in physical consciousness, allowing the possibility for human consciousness to be directly aware and be in the overmind consciousness.

Sri Aurobindo had received a few complaints against Mother on the daily running of the ashram. To settle this matter in finality, Sri Aurobindo declared 'The Mother' to be in sole charge of further activities of the ashram through a letter in April 1930. By August 1930, the ashram members had grown to a number of 80 to 100 residents, a self-sustaining community with all basic amenities fulfilled. 

Sri Aurobindo and Mother's work and principles of yoga was named by them: integral yoga, an all-embracing yoga. This yoga was in variance with older ways of yoga because the follower would not give up the outer life to live in a monastery, but would be present in regular life and practise spirituality in all parts of life. 

By 1937 the ashram residents had grown to more than 150, so there was a need for an expansion of buildings and facilities, helped by Diwan Hyder Ali, the Nizam of Hyderabad who had made a grant to the ashram for further expansion. Under the guidance of Mother, Antonin Raymond, the chief architect, assisted by Franticek Sammer and George Nakashima, constructed a dormitory building. By this time the second world war erupted delaying the construction but was finally completed after ten years and was named Golconde. In 1938 Margaret Woodrow Wilson, the daughter of US President Woodrow Wilson, came to the ashram and chose to remain there for the rest of her life.

By 1939 World War II had broken out. Although some of the members of the ashram may have supported Hitler indirectly because Britain was attacked, but both Mother and Sri Aurobindo publicly declared their support for the Allied forces, mainly by donating to the Viceroy's war fund, much to the surprise of many Indians.

School in ashram and the death of Sri Aurobindo 

On 2 December 1943 Mother started a school for about twenty children inside the ashram. She considered this was a considerable movement away from usual life in the ashram, which was until then about practising total renunciation of the outside world. However, she found that the school would gradually align to the principles of Sri Aurobindo's integral yoga. The school later became known as the Sri Aurobindo International Centre of Education. From 21 February 1949 she started a quarterly magazine called "The Bulletin" in which Sri Aurobindo published a series of eight articles under the title "The supramental manifestation upon earth" wherein for the first time he wrote about transitional being between man and superman.

Sri Aurobindo died on 5 December 1950. This was a very difficult experience for Mother. All the activities in the ashram were suspended for twelve days, after which Mother had to decide the future course of the ashram. Mother decided to take up the entire work of the ashram and also to continue the integral yoga internally. The years from 1950 to 1958 were the years where she was mostly seen by her disciples.

Pondicherry, India 
On 15 August 1954 French Pondicherry became a union territory of India. Mother declared dual citizenship for India and France. Jawaharlal Nehru visited the ashram on 16 January 1955 and met with Mother. This meeting cleared many doubts he had about the ashram. During his second visit to the ashram on 29 September 1955, his daughter Indira Gandhi accompanied him. Mother had a profound effect on her, which developed into a close relationship in later years. Mother continued to teach French after the passing away of Sri Aurobindo. She started with just simple conversations and recitations, which later expanded into deeper discussions about integral yoga where she would read a passage from Sri Aurobindo's or her own writings and comment on them. These sessions grew into a seven-volume book called Questions and Answers. 

After 1958, Mother slowly started to withdraw from outer activities. The year 1958 was also marked by greater progress in yoga. She stopped all her activities from 1959 onwards to devote herself completely towards yoga. On 21 February 1963, on her 85th birthday, she gave her first Darshan from the terrace that had been built for her. From then on she would be present there, on Darshan days where visitors below would gather around to catch a glimpse of her. Mother regularly met with many disciples and one them was  Satprem. He had recorded their conversations, which later he gathered in a volume of 13 books called Mother's Agenda.

Establishing Auroville 

Mother had published an article titled "The Dream" in which she suggested a place on earth that no nation could claim as its sole property, for all humanity with no distinction. In 1964 it was finally decided to build this city. On 28 February 1968 they drew up a charter for the city, Auroville, meaning City of the Dawn (derived from the French word aurore), a model universal township where one of the aims would be to bring about human unity. The city still exists and continues to grow (although not in terms of permanent residents as recorded by census).

Later years 
Many politicians visited Mother on a regular basis for her guidance. She had visits from V.V. Giri, Nandini Satpathy, Dalai Lama, and especially Indira Gandhi who was in close contact with her and often visited her for guidance.  By the end of March 1973 she became critically ill. After 20 May 1973 all meetings were cancelled. She gave her final Darshan on 15 August of the same year, visiting the outside terrace where thousands of followers were waiting to catch a glimpse of her. Mother left her body at 7:25 p.m on 17 November 1973. On 20 November she was laid to rest in Samadhi, next to Sri Aurobindo's body  in the courtyard of the main ashram building.

References

Notes

Citations

Bibliography

Further reading 
 Anon., The Mother – Some dates
 
 (1972b) The Mother, Sri Aurobindo Ashram, Pondicherry
  (2 vols, continuously paginated)
 Alfassa, Mirra (1977) The Mother on Herself, Sri Aurobindo Ashram, Pondicherry
 
 
 (date?) Flowers and Their Messages, Sri Aurobindo Ashram
 (date?) Flowers and Their Spiritual Significance, Sri Aurobindo Ashram
 Das, Nolima ed., (1978) Glimpses of the Mother's Life vol.1, Sri Aurobindo Ashram, Pondicherry
 Mukherjee, Prithwindra (2000), Sri Aurobindo: Biographie, Desclée de Brouwer, Paris
 Nahar, Sujata (1986) Mother's chronicles Bk. 2. Mirra the Artist, Paris: Institut de Recherches Evolutives, Paris & Mira Aditi, Mysore.
 (1989) Mother's chronicles Bk. 3. Mirra the Occultist. Paris: Institut de Recherches Evolutives, Paris & Mira Aditi, Mysore.
K.D. Sethna, The Mother, Past-Present-Future, 1977
 Satprem (1982) The Mind of the Cells (transl by Francine Mahak & Luc Venet) Institute for Evolutionary Research, New York, NY
 Van Vrekhem, Georges: The Mother – The Story of Her Life, Harper Collins Publishers India, New Delhi 2000,  (see also Mother meets Sri Aurobindo – An excerpt from this book)
 Van Vrekhem, Georges: Beyond Man – The Life and Work of Sri Aurobindo and The Mother, HarperCollins Publishers India, New Delhi 1999,

Partial bibliography 
 Commentaries on the Dhammapada, Lotus Press, Twin Lakes, WI 2004, 
 Flowers and Their Messages, Lotus Press, Twin Lakes, WI 
 Search for the Soul in Everyday Living, Lotus Press, Twin Lakes, WI 
 Soul and Its Powers, Lotus Press, Twin Lakes, WI

External links 

Writings by The Mother

1878 births
1973 deaths
French emigrants to India
French expatriates in Japan
19th-century French Sephardi Jews

French people of Egyptian-Jewish descent
French people of Turkish-Jewish descent
Converts to Hinduism from Judaism
French occultists
Indian Hindu spiritual teachers
Sri Aurobindo
Founders of Indian schools and colleges
Clergy from Paris
Académie Julian alumni
Indian women philanthropists
20th-century Indian philanthropists
20th-century Indian women writers
Indian women educational theorists
Auroville
20th-century Indian biographers
Women writers from Tamil Nadu
Converts to Hinduism
20th-century Indian educational theorists
Indian Hindu saints
Scholars from Puducherry
Women educators from Puducherry
Educators from Puducherry
Women mystics
20th-century women educators